Henry Clay Allen (March 19, 1838 – October 31, 1889) was a Virginia lawyer and politician.  He represented Shenandoah County in the Virginia House of Delegates, and served as that body's Speaker from 1877 until 1879.

Early and family life

Henry C. Allen was a middle son born at Beaver Dam, Botetourt County, Virginia, to lawyer and former Congressman, then Judge John J. Allen. His uncle Robert Allen also was a Congressmen.

On January 24, 1867, he married Julia McKay Gatewood.

Career

During the American Civil War, he, his brothers and cousins all enlisted in the Confederate States Army.

After the war, Allen returned to the Shenandoah Valley, where his grandfather had practiced law as well as served as a judge.

Voters elected him to represent Shenandoah County in the Virginia House of Delegates. When Democrat Grover Cleveland became President, Allen  was the United States Attorney for the Western District of Virginia from 1885 until 1889.

References
 
List of former Speakers of the House of Delegates, in the old House chamber in the Virginia State Capitol
 The Political Graveyard

Members of the Virginia House of Delegates
People from Shenandoah County, Virginia
1838 births
1889 deaths
Place of birth missing
19th-century American politicians
United States Attorneys for the Western District of Virginia